The 54th Annual Tony Awards was held at Radio City Music Hall on June 4, 2000 and broadcast by CBS. "The First Ten" awards ceremony was telecast on PBS television. The event was hosted, for the 3rd time since 1997, by Rosie O'Donnell, with special guest Nathan Lane.

The Ceremony
The opening number was  "A Tony Opening", performed by Rosie O'Donnell, Jane Krakowski, Jesse L. Martin, and Megan Mullally.

Production numbers from musicals included Contact, Boyd Gaines and the Girl in the Yellow Dress, Deborah Yates; Kiss Me, Kate, "Too Darn Hot"; Jesus Christ Superstar, "Superstar" and "Gethsemane"; The Music Man, Craig Bierko in "Seventy-Six Trombones" ; The Wild Party, medley from Mandy Patinkin, Eartha Kitt and Toni Collette; Swing!, medley from company and Ann Hampton Callaway and Laura Benanti; and James Joyce's The Dead, "Parnell's Plight."

Ten awards were presented prior to the main ceremony and were broadcast on Public Television in a show titled "The First 10 Awards: Tonys 2000." The show had interviews and showed clips from the season's productions, and presented the awards: Direction (Play and Musical), Choreography, Original Score, Book of a Musical, Costume Design, Scenic Design, Orchestration, Lighting Design and Regional Theater.  Michael Blakemore is the only director to win Tony Awards as Best Director of a Play and Best Director of a Musical in the same year. He won this year for Copenhagen (play) and Kiss Me, Kate (musical).

The television ratings for this broadcast were 7.2, down from the 1999 Tony Award broadcast of 7.9. In prior years in which O'Donnell hosted, the program had ratings of 11.2 (1997) and 10.3 (1998).

Contact controversy
The winner of the award for Best Musical, Contact, raised controversy about what constitutes a musical, as it is a dance musical with no singing and minimal dialogue; and instead of original music, it uses pre-recorded music and songs. As a result of the controversy, a new category was created for the Tony Awards: Best Special Theatrical Event.

Winners and nominees
Winners are in bold

Special awards
Regional Theatre Award
The Utah Shakespearean Festival
Special Lifetime Achievement Tony Award
T. Edward Hambleton

Special Tony Award For a Live Theatrical Presentation
Dame Edna: The Royal Tour
Tony Honors for Excellence in Theatre
Eileen Heckart
Sylvia Herscher
City Center Encores!

Multiple nominations and awards

These productions had multiple nominations:

12 nominations: Kiss Me, Kate 
8 nominations: The Music Man 
7 nominations: Contact and The Wild Party
6 nominations: Swing!
5 nominations: Aida, Dirty Blonde, James Joyce's The Dead, Marie Christine and The Real Thing 
4 nominations: A Moon for the Misbegotten and True West 
3 nominations: Copenhagen  
2 nominations: Amadeus, The Green Bird, The Ride Down Mt. Morgan, Uncle Vanya and Waiting in the Wings   

The following productions received multiple awards.

5 wins: Kiss Me, Kate 
4 wins: Aida and Contact
3 wins: Copenhagen and The Real Thing

See also
 Drama Desk Awards
 2000 Laurence Olivier Awards – equivalent awards for West End theatre productions
 Obie Award
 New York Drama Critics' Circle
 Theatre World Award
 Lucille Lortel Awards

References

External links
Official Site Tony Awards

Tony Awards ceremonies
2000 in theatre
2000 theatre awards
2000 awards in the United States
2000 in New York City
2000s in Manhattan